Enrique de Jesús Cedillo Ortíz (born 8 April 1996) is a Mexican professional footballer who plays as a centre-back for Liga MX club Mazatlán.

Club career
On 22 July 2017, Cedillo made his senior team debut for Club América against Querétaro.

Career statistics

Club

References

1996 births
Living people
Footballers from Mexico City
Association football defenders
Club América footballers
Mexican footballers